Lajos Faragó (3 August 1932 – 13 May 2019) was a Hungarian footballer. He competed in the men's tournament at the 1960 Summer Olympics.

References

External links
 

1932 births
2019 deaths
Hungarian footballers
Hungary international footballers
Olympic footballers of Hungary
Footballers at the 1960 Summer Olympics
Footballers from Budapest
Association football goalkeepers
Medalists at the 1960 Summer Olympics
Olympic bronze medalists for Hungary
Olympic medalists in football
Budapest Honvéd FC players
Hungarian football managers
Nemzeti Bajnokság I managers
Budapest Honvéd FC managers
Hungarian expatriate football managers
Expatriate football managers in Mozambique